The mass media in Iran is both privately and publicly owned but all channels are subject to censorship. In 2016, Iran had 178 newspapers, 83 magazines, 15,000 information sites and 2 million blogs.  A special court has authority to monitor the print media and may suspend publication, or revoke the licenses, of papers or journals that a jury finds guilty of publishing anti-religious or slanderous material or information detrimental to the national interest. The Iranian media is prohibited from criticizing Islamic doctrine (as interpreted by the Iranian government).

Newspapers
Most Iranian newspapers are published in Persian, but newspapers in English and other languages also exist. The most widely circulated periodicals are based in Tehran. Popular daily and weekly newspapers include Iran, Ettelaat, Kayhan, Hamshahri and Resalat. Iran Daily and Tehran Times are both English language papers. Iran’s largest media corporation is Islamic Republic of Iran Broadcasting (IRIB). The Financial Tribune is the main (online) English language economic journal. Iran Front Page (IFP News) is an English News website which provides its audiences with the English version of the latest news and views from Iran published by the Iranian Persian-language media.

Foreign broadcasts
A number of foreign broadcasts are transmitted into the country, including Persian language programmes from Kol Israel and Radio Farda; however, these broadcasts are occasionally countered by radio jamming. The government engages in censorship programs with respect to anything that diverges from national laws and regulations. The majority of Iranians - upwards of 80 percent - get their news from government-owned media. Attempts to establish private, independent media outlets in Iran have been restricted or quashed, and Reporters Without Borders has declared Iran to have the highest number of jailed journalists in the Middle East. Under the 1979 Iranian Constitution, all broadcasting must exclusively be government-operated and, in 1994, the Islamic Republic banned the use of satellite television. In spite of which, over 30 percent of Iranians do in fact watch satellite television channels.

Iranian media include Iranian news agencies, Iranian newspapers, Iranian blogs, Persian-language magazines and Persian-language television stations (not all of which are actually Iranian).

See also

 Cinema of Iran
 Communications and Internet in Iran
 Islamic Republic of Iran Broadcasting
 International Rankings of Iran in Communication
 Ministry of Culture and Islamic Guidance
 Propaganda in Iran
 Television in Iran

References

External links

 Governments
 Ministry of Culture & Islamic Guidance Of Iran Official Website 
 Ministry of Culture & Islamic Guidance Of Iran – Foreign Media Office Official Website – Get Iran Media & Press License 
General
 List of Persian (Iranian) media on the Internet via Gooya
 Gooyauk – Iranian media resources
 Iran Media – List of media sites and news agencies
 Jahani – List of Persian Satellite Channels
 
 
 Get Iran Latest News – Financialtribune Newspaper
 Media Monitoring in Iran 
 

 
Iran
Iran
 
Communications in Iran